Faiz Uddin Ahmed (born 1 June 1924) is a former civil servant, originally at the provincial level in East Pakistan, later in Bangladesh. He was the fourth chairman of the Bangladesh Public Service Commission (BPSC).

Career
Ahmed was recruited into the provincial East Pakistan Civil Service (EPCS) in 1948.

He joined the Provisional Government of Bangladesh in 1971. He was appointed secretary of the Establishment Division of the Cabinet Secretariat in September 1978. In December 1982, he became chairman of the Bangladesh Public Service Commission, a post he held until 1986.

References

1924 births
Possibly living people
Bangladeshi civil servants
Bangladesh Krishak Sramik Awami League central committee members